José Mauro Ramalho De Alarcón Santiago (14 May 1925 – 9 December 2019) was a Brazilian Roman Catholic bishop.

Ramalho was born in Brazil and was ordained to the priesthood in 1948. He served as bishop of the Roman Catholic Diocese of Iguatu, Brazil from 1962 to 2000.

Notes

1925 births
2019 deaths
20th-century Roman Catholic bishops in Brazil
Roman Catholic bishops of Iguatu